Hajji Ali Kand (also Romanized as Ḩājjī ‘Alī Kand; also known as Hāj‘alī Kand, Hāji ‘Ali Khān, Ḩājj’alī Kand, and Ḩājjī ‘Alī Kandī) is a village in Akhtachi-ye Gharbi Rural District, in the Central District of Mahabad County, West Azerbaijan Province, Iran. At the 2006 census, its population was 765, in 110 families.

References 

Populated places in Mahabad County